Murrieta Hot Springs is a neighborhood in the eastern region of Murrieta, California, which was annexed on July 1, 2002. Prior to annexation, Murrieta Hot Springs was a Census-designated place of Riverside County, California. The population was 2,948 at the 2000 census.

French Valley Airport (FAA designator: F70), near Murrieta Hot Springs, has a  runway.

Geography
Murrieta Hot Springs is located at  (33.562880, -117.155610).

According to the United States Census Bureau, the CDP has a total area of 1.3 square miles (3.3 km2), of which, 1.3 square miles (3.3 km2) of it is land and 0.78% is water.

History
The Luiseño called the thermal springs Cherukanukna Hakiwuna. They bathed in the warm waters and believed the springs had healing powers.

Fritz Guenther, a German emigrant, bought the Murrieta Hot Springs tract in 1902 and developed a world-class health spa resort.  The Guenther family sold the property in 1970 to Irvin Kahn, a San Diego attorney and real estate developer. The first two parcels at the end of Princessa Circle were built for Kahn, and his friend KFMB-TV founder Jack O. Gross.  Kahn died unexpectedly in 1973, and the property went through a series of owners after his death.

In 1994, the former resort was purchased and restored by Calvary Chapel Of Santa Ana. It would become the new home of expanding Calvary Chapel Bible College for the next 28 years. The resort was transformed into a Christian college with conference center, dormitories, and libraries. Murrieta Police Department additionally was provided a substation on campus.

In August 2022, it was announced Calvary Chapel Bible College completed sale of the property to Olympus Real Estate Group for $50 million. The group reportedly intends to renovate the facility and reopen as a health spa resort.

The ZIP Code 92362 was originally used, until 92563 was introduced in the early 1990s.

Demographics
As of the census of 2000, there were 2,948 people, 1,340 households, and 769 families residing in the CDP. The racial makeup of the CDP was 91.86% White, 1.56% African American, 0.64% Native American, 1.93% Asian, 0.03% Pacific Islander, 1.70% from other races, and 2.27% from two or more races. Hispanic or Latino of any race were 8.11% of the population.

There were 1,340 households, out of which 8.4% had children under the age of 18 living with them, 49.8% were married couples living together, 6.3% had a female householder with no husband present, and 42.6% were non-families. 38.5% of all households were made up of individuals, and 28.2% had someone living alone who was 65 years of age or older.  The average household size was 1.85 and the average family size was 2.37.

In the CDP the population was spread out, with 8.1% under the age of 18, 16.0% from 18 to 24, 13.0% from 25 to 44, 19.4% from 45 to 64, and 43.6% who were 65 years of age or older.  The median age was 61 years. For every 100 females there were 82.4 males.  For every 100 females age 18 and over, there were 81.2 males.

The median income for a household in the CDP was $27,311, and the median income for a family was $35,102. Males had a median income of $39,081 versus $28,594 for females. The per capita income for the CDP was $19,991.  About 5.2% of families and 6.3% of the population were below the poverty line, including none of those under age 18 and 6.5% of those age 65 or over.

Government

References

Former Census-designated places in Riverside County, California
Communities in Riverside County, California
Neighborhoods in Riverside County, California